Mansfield is a small city in, and the parish seat of, DeSoto Parish, Louisiana, United States. Mansfield is part of the Shreveport–Bossier City metropolitan statistical area, with a 2020 population of 4,714.

Geography

According to the United States Census Bureau, the city has a total area of 3.7 square miles (9.6 km2), all land.

Demographics

As of the 2020 United States census, there were 4,714 people, 1,916 households, and 1,165 families residing in the city.

Notable people
Mansfield was the childhood home of Joshua Logan, an award-winning director, producer, playwright and screenwriter for film and stage.  He is most famous for directing Hollywood classics such as South Pacific, Picnic, Paint Your Wagon, Sayonara, Bus Stop and Fanny.  Logan received the Pulitzer Prize at the age of forty for the libretto of South Pacific, which he cowrote with Oscar Hammerstein II.  Logan used Mansfield as the setting for his play The Wisteria Trees.

Ocie Lee Smith was an American singer, who performed with Count Basie's band from 1961 to 1965 and sang on the 1969 Grammy Award-winning recording of the song "Little Green Apples". He was born in Mansfield on June 21, 1932.

Mansfield is the birthplace of major league baseball player Vida Blue (born Vida Rochelle Blue, Jr. on July 28, 1949), a left-handed starting pitcher. In a 17-year career, he played for the Oakland Athletics, San Francisco Giants, and Kansas City Royals. Also Jesse Hudson, New York Mets pitcher. They graduated Mansfield High School in 1967 together.

Mansfield is also the birthplace of Albert Lewis (born Albert Ray Lewis on October 6, 1960). Lewis made his professional debut in the NFL in 1983 with the Kansas City Chiefs. He played for the Kansas City Chiefs, Oakland Raiders, and Los Angeles Raiders over the course of his 16-year career.
NFL cornerback Faquir Brown (born Faquir Hamin Brown on September 21, 1977) initially attended Mansfield High School.

Others affiliated with Mansfield by birth or residence include:

Sylura Barron (1900-1997), first African-American woman delegate to a national political convention (1948)
Joe T. Cawthorn (1911-1967), lawyer, businessman, and politician affiliated with Long faction
Charles Wheaton Elam (1866–1917), state representative from 1892 to 1896
Joseph Barton Elam, Sr. (1821–1885), state representative, U.S. representative
Riemer Calhoun (1909-1994), state senator from DeSoto and Caddo parishes from 1944 to 1952
Jeff Hall, accountant in Alexandria and Democratic member of the Louisiana House for District 26 since 2015; former Mansfield resident 
Charles Johnson (born 1956), American football player
Jeter Jones, blues musician
Sidney Maiden (1923-1970), country blues musician, a singer and harmonica player who played with the guitarist K. C. Douglas
Sammy Joe Odom (1941–2001), professional football player.  Odom was a college football standout at Northwestern State University in Natchitoches and played a season for the Houston Oilers in 1964.
Arthur T. Prescott (1863-1942), founding president of Louisiana Tech University, born in Mansfield but reared in St. Landry Parish
Mack Charles Reynolds (1935–1991), professional football player
C. O. Simpkins (1925–2019), African-American dentist, state representative, and civil rights activist in Shreveport

References

 
Cities in Louisiana
Cities in DeSoto Parish, Louisiana
Parish seats in Louisiana
Cities in Shreveport – Bossier City metropolitan area
Populated places in Ark-La-Tex
County seats in the Ark-La-Tex